Aleksandar Okolić (born 26 June 1993) is a Serbian male volleyball player. He is part of the Serbia men's national volleyball team and played at the 2015 Men's European Volleyball Championship. On club level he plays for Crvena Zvezda Beograd.

Sporting achievements

Club
National Championships 
2011/2012  Serbian Championship, with Crvena Zvezda
2012/2013  Serbian Championship , with Crvena Zvezda
2013/2014  Serbian Championship , with Crvena Zvezda
2014/2015  Serbian Championship , with Crvena Zvezda
2015/2016  Serbian Championship , with Crvena Zvezda
2016/2017  German Championship, with Berlin Recycling
2017/2018  German Championship, with Berlin Recycling
2020/2021  Greek Championship, with Olympiacos
National Cups
2008/2009     Serbian Cup, with Crvena Zvezda
2010/2011     Serbian Cup, with Crvena Zvezda
2012/2013     Serbian Cup, with Crvena Zvezda
2013/2014     Serbian Cup, with Crvena Zvezda
2014/2015     Serbian Cup, with Crvena Zvezda
2018/2019     Greek Cup , with P.A.O.K.
2018/2019     German Cup, with Berlin Recycling
National Super Cups

2012     Serbian Super Cup, with Crvena Zvezda.
2013     Serbian Super Cup, with Crvena Zvezda
2014     Serbian Super Cup, with Crvena Zvezda
2015     Serbian Super Cup, with Crvena Zvezda

National team
 2015  FIVB World League
 2016  FIVB World League
 2017  CEV European Championship
 2019   CEV European Championship

References

External links
 Aleksandar Okolic at the International Volleyball Federation
 
 

1993 births
Living people
Serbian men's volleyball players
People from Modriča
Serbs of Bosnia and Herzegovina
Serbian expatriate sportspeople in Germany
Expatriate volleyball players in Germany
Expatriate volleyball players in Greece
Expatriate volleyball players in Russia
European champions for Serbia